The discography of Loona, a Dutch singer, consists of 7 studio albums, three compilation albums, two extended plays, 37 singles, including 12 as featured artist, 8 promotional singles, and 42 music videos, including 12 as featured artist. Loona was first featured on numerous singles by DJ Sammy under the artist name Carisma. The first release as Loona was the debut studio album Lunita in 1999, preceded by the massive chart hits "Bailando", a Paradisio cover version, and the Mecano classic "Hijo de la Luna", both released in 1998. This success was followed with the sophomore release Entre dos aguas in 2000, preceded by the controversial single release "Mamboleo", a cover version of Herbert Grönemeyer's song "Mambo", which has been removed on later pressings. The albums Colors, Wind of Time, Moonrise and Rakatakata (Un Rayo de Sol) followed in 2002, 2005, 2008 and 2013 respectively. In 2014, Loona released her first single "Ademloos door de Nacht" under her real name Marie-José van der Kolk, a Dutch-language cover version of German singer Helene Fischer's single "Atemlos durch die Nacht", from her upcoming studio album.

Albums

Studio albums

EPs

Compilation albums

Singles

Promotional singles

Featured singles

Music videos

Featured music videos

Notes

References

Discographies of Dutch artists
Discography